, third son of Miyoshi Motonaga, brothers of Miyoshi Nagayoshi, Miyoshi Yukiyasu and Sogō Kazunari, was a Japanese samurai who lived in the Sengoku period. He was active in the Awaji region, and was also known as a poet. 

He had a son named Atagi Nobuyasu. He was also known as Waka poet.

He was purged by his brother Miyoshi Nagayoshi in 1564.

References

Samurai
1528 births
1564 deaths
Miyoshi clan
Suicides by seppuku
16th-century Japanese people
16th-century Japanese poets